Morgan Hook and Ladder Company is a historic fire station located at Naples in Ontario County, New York. The original part of the two story, frame structure was built about 1830 as a Federal style dwelling and later expanded and converted to a fire station in 1891 or 1892.  It features a prominent hose drying / bell tower.  It ceased being used as a fire station in 1926.

It was listed on the National Register of Historic Places in 1995.

References

External links

The Morgan Hook and Ladder Company Building by Beth Flory, The Crooked Lake Review, Summer 2000

Fire stations on the National Register of Historic Places in New York (state)
Federal architecture in New York (state)
Houses completed in 1830
Fire stations completed in 1892
Towers completed in 1892
Buildings and structures in Ontario County, New York
Defunct fire stations in New York (state)
1830 establishments in New York (state)
National Register of Historic Places in Ontario County, New York